Jacques Georges (30 May 1916 – 25 February 2004) was the president of the French Football Federation (FFF) from 1968 until 1972 and the 4th president of UEFA (1983–1990).

Biography
In April 1989, he caused controversy by describing a minority of Liverpool F.C. supporters as "beasts", wrongly believing that hooliganism was the cause of the Hillsborough disaster which ultimately resulted in the deaths of 97 of the English club's fans. He issued a swift apology for his comments upon discovering that hooliganism did not cause the tragedy.

He died in February 2004 at the age of 88.

References 

1916 births
2004 deaths
HEC Paris alumni
Presidents of UEFA
Sportspeople from Vosges (department)
Presidents of the French Football Federation
Association football executives